See also Queen Alexandra Range

Alexandra Mountains is a group of low, separated mountains in the north portion of Edward VII Peninsula, just southwest of Sulzberger Bay in Marie Byrd Land, Antarctica. Discovered in January–February 1902 by the British National Antarctic Expedition during an exploratory cruise of the Discovery along the Ross Ice Shelf. Named for Alexandra, then Queen of the United Kingdom.

List of mountains 
 Balsley Peak is a distinctive peak (c. 1100m) located 1.4 nautical miles (2.6 km) southeast of La Gorce Peak. Named by Advisory Committee on Antarctic Names (US-ACAN) (2004) after James R. Balsley, U.S. Geological Survey, who conducted airborne magnetometer near this peak during U.S. Navy Operation Highjump, 1946–47; later Chief, Branch of Geophysics, United States Geological Survey (USGS).
 Bowman Peak is a peak on the south side of Butler Glacier, in the Alexandra Mountains. Discovered by the Byrd Antarctic Expedition in 1929 and named for John McEntee Bowman, president of the Bowman-Biltmore Hotels Corporation, who donated headquarters for the preparation of the expedition.
 Mount Josephine is a peak marked by prominent rock outcrops, 6 miles (10 km) southeast of Bowman Peak. Discovered by Rear Admiral Byrd while on the Byrd Antarctic Expedition Eastern Flight of December 5, 1929, and named by him during the Byrd Antarctic Expedition (1933–35) for Josephine Clay Ford, daughter of Edsel Ford, contributor to both expeditions.
 La Gorce Peak is a prominent summit  SW of Mount Josephine, standing at the southern end and marking the highest peak in the Alexandra Mountains. Discovered in February 1929 by the Byrd Antarctic Expedition, and named by Byrd for John Oliver La Gorce.
 Scott Nunataks are conspicuous twin elevations which form the north end of the Alexandra Mountains. Discovered in 1902 by the British National Antarctic Expedition under Captain Robert F. Scott and named after Scott by Lieutenant Kristian Prestrud, leader of the Eastern Sledge Party of Amundsen's South Pole expedition who ascended the features while exploring Edward VII Peninsula in 1911.
 Sneddon Nunataks is a group of coastal nunataks on the north side of Edward VII Peninsula which overlooks the Swinburne Ice Shelf and Sulzberger Bay. They stand  ESE of Scott Nunataks in the northern part of the Alexandra Mountains. The nunataks appear on the map of the Byrd Antarctic Expedition, 1928-30. Named by US-ACAN for Donald L. Sneddon, U.S. Navy, electronics technician with the Byrd Station winter party in 1967.
 Mount Swadener is a peak in the Sneddon Nunataks, in the north portion of the Alexandra Mountains. Mapped by USGS from surveys and U.S. Navy air photos, 1959-66. Named by US-ACAN for Lieutenant John R. Swadener, U.S. Navy, navigator of the ski-equipped R4D in which Rear Admiral George J. Dufek made the first aircraft landing at the geographic South Pole, on October 31, 1956.
It stands at the head of Cumbie Glacier and overlooks Swinburne Ice Shelf and Sulzberger Bay which are just to its north. The mountain was first mapped by the United States Geological Survey (USGS) from surveys and U.S. Navy air photos, 1964-66. It was named by the Advisory Committee on Antarctic Names (US-ACAN) for Captain Samuel A. Youngman, U.S. Navy, medical officer on the staff of the Commander, U.S. Naval Support Force, Antarctica, during Operation Deep Freeze 1969 and 1970.

References

Mountain ranges
Mountain ranges of Antarctica
King Edward VII Land